Labordia lydgatei, the Wahiawa Mountain labordia, is a species of flowering plant in the Loganiaceae family. It is endemic to the Hawaiian Islands, where it is present only in the Wahiawa Mountains of Kauai.  It is threatened by habitat loss.

References

lydgatei
Endemic flora of Hawaii
Biota of Kauai
Taxonomy articles created by Polbot